Holy Trinity Anglican Church may refer to:

Australia
 Holy Trinity Church, Adelaide, South Australia
 Holy Trinity Church, Fortitude Valley in Brisbane, Queensland
 Holy Trinity Anglican Church, Woolloongabba in Brisbane, Queensland
 Holy Trinity Anglican Church, Chatswood in Sydney, New South Wales

Canada
 Holy Trinity Anglican Church (Winnipeg, Manitoba)
 Holy Trinity Anglican Church (Alma, Prince Edward Island)
 Holy Trinity Anglican Church (Maple Grove, Quebec)
 Holy Trinity Anglican Church (Stanley Mission, Saskatchewan)

Elsewhere
 Holy Trinity Anglican Church (Algiers, Algeria)
 Holy Trinity Anglican Church, Raleigh, United States
 Holy Trinity Anglican Church (Singapore)

See also
 Holy Trinity Church (disambiguation)
 Holy Trinity Episcopal Church (disambiguation)